The Mystic Bridge Historic District is a historic district in the village of Mystic, Connecticut on the Stonington side of the Mystic River.  It includes the Mystic Seaport Museum, whose grounds and floating vessels represent the area's history, and the 1924 Mystic River Bascule Bridge.  The district is significant as a well-preserved shipbuilding and maritime village of the 19th and early 20th centuries, and it was added to the National Register of Historic Places in 1979.

History

Mystic developed in the early 19th century as a small seaport and shipbuilding center, businesses that were mostly located on the eastern shore of the Mystic River. The village is divided between the towns of Stonington and Groton, Connecticut.

The Greenman brothers, George, Clark and Thomas founded the George Greenman & Co. shipyard and built their Greek Revival style houses on the grounds.  Their shipyard was one of the village's largest, and now serves as the grounds of the Mystic Seaport Museum.  The museum still uses some of the buildings for their original purposes.  This section of Mystic became known as "Greenmanville", as the brothers not only owned and operated the shipyard, but also a textile mill and a company store.  They also managed nearby farms and rented out housing to their workers. The Greenmans were Seventh Day Baptists, celebrating the Sabbath on Saturday, and the shipyard's schedule reflected that. The industrial village prospered from the 1840s to the 1890s, after which it declined, as wooden ships gave way to those built of iron and steel.

Gallery

See also
Mystic Seaport Museum, part of the district
National Register of Historic Places listings in New London County, Connecticut
List of bridges on the National Register of Historic Places in Connecticut

References

External links

Queen Anne architecture in Connecticut
Italianate architecture in Connecticut
Mystic, Connecticut
Historic districts in New London County, Connecticut
Historic American Engineering Record in Connecticut
Bascule bridges in the United States
Drawbridges on the National Register of Historic Places
National Register of Historic Places in New London County, Connecticut
Historic districts on the National Register of Historic Places in Connecticut
Bridges in Connecticut